Aroeiras do Itaim is a municipality in the Brazilian state of Piauí. The municipality was founded on 1 January 2005. There are 2,551 people residing in the city, according to IBGE.

References 

Municipalities in Piauí
Populated places established in 2005